The Metropolitan Bank and Trust Company, commonly known as Metrobank, is the fourth largest bank in the Philippines. It offers various financial services, from regular banking to insurance. It is the commercial and retail banking arm of GT Capital Holdings Inc.

History
Metropolitan Bank and Trust Company (Metrobank) was established by a group of businessmen on September 5, 1962, at the Wellington Building in Binondo, Manila. In August 1963, the bank's first branch was established in Divisoria. Four years later, Metrobank opened its first provincial branch, the Davao branch. At the onset of the 1970s, Metrobank opened its first international branch in Taipei, Taiwan's capital city.

In April 1997, the Central Bank authorized Metrobank to operate a foreign currency deposit unit (FCDU). In the same year, branches and offices totaled 100 and the bank inaugurated its new head office at Metrobank Plaza in Makati.

On August 21, 1981, the Central Bank authorized Metrobank to operate as a universal bank. Following the grant of the universal banking license, Metrobank entered the following ventures: the acquisition of majority ownership of Philippine Savings Bank (the second largest savings bank in the country at that time); the establishment of a joint travel agency venture with Thomas Cook Group in Thomas Cook Phils., Inc. in 1986; and the tying-up with Toyota Motor Corporation of Japan and Mitsui to put up Toyota Motor Philippines in 1988. Metrobank subsequently entered into joint ventures with several renowned corporations like Sumitomo Mitsui Banking Corporation of Japan to create Sumigin Metro Investment Corporation; the National Mutual Holdings Ltd. of Australia to create Philippine Axa Life Insurance Corporation; and the ORIX of Japan to create ORIX Metro Leasing and Finance Corporation.

In September 1982, the number of Metrobank branches, offices and subsidiaries surpassed 200.

The bank continued to experience steady growth through the years. The bank's total capital funds on June 30, 2006 stood at P57.3 billion. As of June 2007 assets reached  ($14.5 billion) (=$1).

In 1990, alongside Chinabank, Citibank, RCBC and Security Bank, Metrobank become a founding member of BancNet.

Metrobank's subsidiaries are Toyota Motor Philippines Corporation, Philippine Savings Bank, First Metro Investment Corporation, Metrobank Card Corporation, ORIX Metro Leasing and Finance Corporation, SMBC Metro Investment Corporation, First Metro Travelex (formerly Thomas Cook (Phils.), Philippine Axa Life Insurance Corporation, Mirant Global Corporation, Philippine Charter Insurance Corporation, MBTC Technology, Inc., Robert Browns Wear Inc (Moose Gear & Moose Girl Apparel), Toyota Financial Services Corporation, Toyota Cubao, Inc., Toyota Manila Bay Corporation, First Metro Securities Corporation, First Metro International Investment Co. Ltd., Metropolitan Bank (Bahamas) Ltd., MB Remittance Center Inc. (USA), Metro Remittance Singapore, Metro Remittance UK Limited, Metro Remittance (Italia) SpA, Metro Remittance S.A. (Spain) and MBTC Exchange Services GmbH (Austria).

The Metrobank Group has a combined network of over 800 local and international branches/offices, remittance offices and subsidiaries worldwide. It has 557 domestic branches and 32 offices in New York, Hong Kong, Tokyo, Osaka, Seoul, Pusan, Guam, Taipei, Kaohsiung, Madrid, Barcelona, Vienna, Rome, Bologna, Milan, Singapore, Chicago, Hawaii, and Shanghai.

On September 17, 2008, Bangko Sentral ng Pilipinas Governor Amando M. Tetangco Jr. announced Banco de Oro and Metrobank set aside provisions totalling $94.7 million  to cover their exposure to the Lehman Brothers' collapse. The BSP data revealed Metrobank has a Lehman Brothers exposure of $71 million, and it set aside a buffer equivalent to 70% of its exposure.

On September 28, 2009, Metrobank is the first local bank to offer a line of CNY denominated offerings.

In 2017, Metrobank made a deal with ANZ to increase its stake at Metrobank Card Corp. (MCC) from 60 percent to 100 percent. Metrobank's joint venture with ANZ was formed in 2003. Since then, MCC has become a leading provider of credit cards in the Philippines, with more than 1.5 million cards based from the data of the Credit Card Association of the Philippines (CCAP). MCC is also number one in terms of receivables based on CCAP data. ANZ, on their part, announced that they would sell half of their 40% stake at MCC for US$144 million and had an option to sell the remaining 20% stake to Metrobank on the same terms, which would be exercisable in the fourth quarter of the 2018 fiscal year.

Subsidiaries and affiliates
Metrobank is divided into the following subsidiaries and affiliates, which are listed depending on their location of operation:

Domestic subsidiaries and affiliates
First Metro Investment Corporation
First Metro Securities Brokerage Corporation
First Metro Travelex
Manila Doctors Hospital
Manila Tytana Colleges (formerly Manila Doctors College)
Metrobank Card Corporation (formerly Unibancard Corporation) 
Orix Metro Leasing and Finance Corporation
Philippine Axa Life Insurance Corporation
Charter Ping An Insurance Corporation
Philippine Savings Bank
SMBC Metro Investment Corporation
Toyota Cubao Inc.
Toyota Financial Services Philippines Corporation
Toyota Manila Bay Corporation
Toyota Motor Philippines Corporation
Moose Gear and Moose Girl

International subsidiaries and affiliates
First Metro International Investment Corporation Ltd. HK
MBTC Exchange Service GmbH - Vienna
MB Remittance Center HK
Metro Remittance Center SA - Spain
Metro Remittance (Italia) SpA
Metro Remittance Singapore Pte Ltd
Metro Remittance (UK) Limited

Ownership structure
As of September 30, 2020, the following are the major stockholders:

Competition 
Metrobank, as was once the second largest Philippine bank, is always trying to stave off competition to remain one of the country's largest banks. Its main competitors are Sy-led Banco de Oro and Bank of the Philippine Islands (BPI) of the Ayala group. Other major competitors include state-owned Landbank and  UCPB, Lucio Tan-owned Philippine National Bank, Gotianun-led EastWest, Security Bank of the Dy family, Chinabank (partly owned by the Sy and Dee families) and the Rizal Commercial Banking Corporation (RCBC) of the Yuchengco family.

See also
 BancNet (the Metrobank ATM network)
 List of banks in the Philippines

References

External links 

 Metrobank
 Reuters, Stock Quote
 Reuters, Metropolitan Bank & Trust Co (Philippine Stock Exchange), Analyst Research
 Reuters Full Description
 Top 10 Commercial Banks in the Philippines, as of December 31, 2008

Banks of the Philippines
Companies listed on the Philippine Stock Exchange
Companies based in Makati